Gastón Rubén Esmerado (born 8 February 1978 in Lomas de Zamora) is a retired Argentine footballer and current manager of Club Almagro.

Career
Esmerado, nicknamed "Gato" started his playing career in 1996 with Club Atlético Lanús, he only played 3 games in the Argentine Primera before stepping down a division to play for Olimpo de Bahía Blanca in the Primera B Nacional.

In 1999, he joined Arsenal de Sarandí where he was part of the team that won promotion to the Primera for the first time in their history in 2002, he played for the club until 2005. he played 224 times for Arsenal scoring 15 goals, 119 of his appearances for the club came in the Argentine Primera.

In 2006, he joined Estudiantes de La Plata but soon moved on to join Colón de Santa Fe where he played until the end of 2007. in 2008 he had a brief spell with Greek side Skoda Xanthi before returning to Argentina to play for Club Atlético Huracán.

Honours
Arsenal
Argentine Primera División: 2012 Clausura

References

 Gastón Esmerado marcó de penal y fue sustituido en su retiro como profesional‚ infobae.com, 2 November 2015

External links
Sports Ya profile 
Gastón Esmerado – Argentine Primera statistics at Fútbol XXI  

1978 births
Living people
People from Lomas de Zamora
Argentine footballers
Argentine expatriate footballers
Association football midfielders
Club Atlético Lanús footballers
Olimpo footballers
Arsenal de Sarandí footballers
Estudiantes de La Plata footballers
Club Atlético Colón footballers
Club Atlético Huracán footballers
Xanthi F.C. players
Argentine Primera División players
Argentine expatriate sportspeople in Greece
Expatriate footballers in Greece
Argentine football managers
Almagro managers
Nueva Chicago managers
Sportspeople from Buenos Aires Province